William Burke, 7th Earl of Clanricarde, PC (Ire) (died 1687), was an Irish peer who fought in his youth together with his brother Richard, 6th Earl of Clanricarde under their cousin, Ulick Burke, 1st Marquess of Clanricarde against the Parliamentarians in the Cromwellian conquest of Ireland. He succeeded his brother as the 7th Earl in 1666.

Birth and origins 
William was a younger son of Sir William Burke and his wife Joan. His father was the third son of Ulick Burke, 3rd Earl of Clanricarde. William's mother was a daughter of Dermot O'Shaugnessy of Gort.

William was the younger of two brothers:
Richard (died 1666), became the 6th Earl of Clanricarde
William (died 1687)

It is likely that he also had sisters, but nothing seems to be known about them.

First marriage 
His first wife was Lettice Shirley, daughter of Sir Henry Shirley, 2nd Baronet, by Lady Dorothy Devereux and granddaughter of Robert Devereux, 2nd Earl of Essex. She was born about 1617 and died on 25 September 1655. They had three sons:

 
Richard (died after 1708), became the 8th Earl of Clanricarde;
John (1642–1722), became the 9th Earl of Clanricarde.
Thomas (died 1688), killed at the Siege of Buda, Hungary;

Early life and Irish wars 
During William's childhood his uncle Richard was Earl of Clanricarde, the 4th of his name. That uncle died on 12 November 1635 and was succeeded by his cousin Ulick as the 5th Earl and 1st Marquess. Ulick was neutral during the Irish Confederate Wars and fought the Parliamentarians during the Cromwellian Conquest of Ireland. He lost the Battle of Meelick Island in 1650 and surrendered to the Parliamentarians on 28 June 1652. He died in July 1657 and was succeeded by William's brother Richard as the 6th Earl of Clanricarde.

Second marriage 
Burke married secondly to Helen, widow of Sir John FitzGerald of Dromana and daughter of Donough MacCarty, 1st Earl of Clancarty. The date of this marriage is constrained by the death of her first husband in 1662 or 1664 and the birth of their eldest son in about 1670.

 
William and Helen had four children:

Ulick (1670–1691), was created Viscount of Galway and fell at the Battle of Aughrim fighting for the Jacobites;
Margaret (1673–1744), first married Bryan Magennis, 5th Viscount of Iveagh, and then Thomas Butler of Garryricken;
William, died childless in France;
Honora (c. 1675 – 1698), married 1st Patrick Sarsfield and 2nd the Duke of Berwick.
Thomas (d.1666)

7th Earl 
In 1666 his elder brother Richard, the 6th Earl of Clanricarde, died and William eventually succeeded as the 7th Earl of Clanricarde. The date falls into the bracket of the not precisely known date of his second marriage.

Late life, death, succession, and timeline 
Clanricarde, as he now was, became Lord Lieutenant of Galway in 1680 and its Chief Governor in 1687. In 1681 he become a member of the Irish Privy Council.

Clanricarde died in October 1687 and was succeeded by his eldest son Richard as the 8th Earl of Clanricarde. His daughter Honora inherited a fortune of £3,500 from her father.

Notes and references

Notes

Citation

Sources 

 
  (for Clanricarde)
  – Jim Burke!
  – (Preview)
 
  – G to K (for Viscount Galway)
  – Canonteign to Cutts (for Clancarty and Clanricarde)
  – (for timeline)
  – 1696 (for Honora's inheritance)
  – Blood royal, dukes, earls (for Clanricarde)

Further reading 
 
Burke, Bourke & De Burgh: People and Places, Eamon Bourke, Dublin, 1995. (Google Books, no preview)
From Warlords to Landlords: Political and Social Change in Galway 1540-1640, Bernadette Cunningham, in "Galway: History and Society", 1996.

 

1687 deaths
Earls of Clanricarde
William
Members of the Irish House of Lords
Politicians from County Galway